The 1922 All-Ireland Senior Hurling Championship was the 36th staging of the All-Ireland Senior Hurling Championship, the Gaelic Athletic Association's premier inter-county hurling tournament. The championship began in May 1922 and ended on 9 September 1923.

The championship was won by Kilkenny who secured the title following a 4-2 to 2-6 defeat of Tipperary in the All-Ireland final. This was their 8th All-Ireland title, their first in nine championship seasons.

Limerick were the defending champions but were defeated by Tipperary in the Munster final

Results

Connacht Senior Hurling Championship

Leinster Senior Hurling Championship

Munster Senior Hurling Championship

All-Ireland Senior Hurling Championship

Championship statistics

Miscellaneous

 Kilkenny win their 8th championship and overtake Cork in second position on the all time roll of honour.

Sources

 Corry, Eoghan, The GAA Book of Lists (Hodder Headline Ireland, 2005).
 Donegan, Des, The Complete Handbook of Gaelic Games (DBA Publications Limited, 2005).

References

1922
All-Ireland Senior Hurling Championship